is a national park comprising two separate areas of Aomori, Iwate, and Akita Prefectures, Japan. The Towada-Hakkōda area encompasses Lake Towada, Mount Hakkōda, and most of the Oirase River valley.

Related municipalities
 Aomori: Aomori, Hirakawa, Kuroishi, Towada
 Iwate: Hachimantai, Shizukuishi, Takizawa
 Akita: Kazuno, Kosaka, Semboku

See also

List of national parks of Japan

References

External links
  
  Towada-Hachimantai National Park (JNTO)
  Towada-Hachimantai National Park
 Map of Towada-Hachimantai National Park (area 1)
 Map of Towada-Hachimantai National Park (area 2)

National parks of Japan
Parks and gardens in Akita Prefecture
Parks and gardens in Aomori Prefecture
Parks and gardens in Iwate Prefecture
Protected areas established in 1936
1936 establishments in Japan